Heavy Love is a studio album by English musician Duke Garwood. It was released in February 2015 under Heavenly Recordings.

Reception
At Metacritic, which assigns a weighted average score out of 100 to reviews from mainstream critics, Heavy Love received an average score of 76% based on 11 reviews, indicating "generally favorable reviews".

Track listing

Charts

References

External links
 

2015 albums
Heavenly Recordings albums
Duke Garwood albums